El Manshiyya (  ) is a neighborhood in Alexandria, Egypt. One of the older parts of the city, it saw major change in the 19th and 20th centuries, becoming the main center of administration and business in the city. The headquarters of the Alexandria Governorate (which was burned down during the 2011 Revolution) and the Alexandria Court of Appeal are both in El Mansheya, as are the Alexandria offices of the Egyptian Exchange.

See also 

 Neighborhoods in Alexandria

Populated places in Alexandria Governorate
Neighbourhoods of Alexandria